A Fair Impostor may refer to:

 A Fair Impostor (novel), 1909 work by Charles Garvice
 A Fair Impostor (film), a 1916 film adaptation directed by Alexander Butler